Pearl City Worship is an Indian Christian music worship group from Hyderabad, Telangana, India, where they started in 2016, after being discovered by Ian Eskelin at Pearl City Church. They have released one studio album, We Won't Be Silent (2016).

Background 

The group formed at Pearl City Church which is now, Hope Unlimited Church in Hyderabad, Telangana, India, in 2016, after being discovered by Ian Eskelin, and signing to his label Radiate Music. The leaders of the church are Allen Ganta, Rufus and Mayuri Ganta, and Anand Gantela. This group is currently part of Hope Unlimited Church, Hyderabad, Telangana, India.

Music history 

Their first studio album, We Won't Be Silent, was released on 18 March 2016, through Radiate Music.

Discography 

Studio albums
We Won't Be Silent (18 March 2016, Radiate)

References

External links 

 
 Hallels Interview

Musical groups established in 2016
Indian musical groups
2016 establishments in Telangana